Jo Morrison (née Steed) is a former New Zealand international netball representative, who played in the Silver Ferns team that won a silver medal at the 1998 Commonwealth Games in Kuala Lumpur.

In 2021 Morrison was appointed the role of assistant coach of the Southern Steel under Reinga Bloxham.

References 

Living people
New Zealand netball players
Commonwealth Games silver medallists for New Zealand
Commonwealth Games medallists in netball
1975 births
Netball players at the 1998 Commonwealth Games
AENA Super Cup players
New Zealand expatriate sportspeople in England
English netball players
Medallists at the 1998 Commonwealth Games